Saint-Laurent-des-Eaux is a former commune of the Loir-et-Cher department of France. In 1972, it was merged with Nouan-sur-Loire to form the new commune of Saint-Laurent-Nouan.

The Saint-Laurent Nuclear Power Plant is located here, it comprises:

 Two UNGG reactors, now closed. These entered service in 1969 and 1971, and were closed in 1990 and 1992.
 Two PWRs, each of 900 MWe, which entered service in 1983.

References

Former communes of Loir-et-Cher